Noora Laukkanen (born February 3, 1993 in Helsinki) is a Finnish swimmer who competes in the Women's 400m Individual Medley. She competed at the 2012 Summer Olympics. She is a member of the Oulun Uimarit-73 club in Oulu.

References

Finnish female medley swimmers
1993 births
Living people
Swimmers from Helsinki
Olympic swimmers of Finland
Swimmers at the 2008 Summer Olympics
Swimmers at the 2012 Summer Olympics
Swimmers at the 2010 Summer Youth Olympics